is a fictional character in Capcom's Street Fighter  fighting game series. First introduced in Street Fighter IV, he is the main antagonist and final boss of the game and its subsequent updates. He is the chief executive officer of the Shadaloo Intimidation Network (S.I.N.), the weapons division of the Shadaloo terrorist organization in the game's narrative. His body has been heavily modified using advanced technology, with a device installed in his abdomen called the "Tanden Engine". Other appearances by Seth include Project X Zone and Street Fighter V. Seth is voiced by Akio Ōtsuka in Japanese, and Michael McConnohie in English.

As a boss character in Street Fighter IV, Seth is not particularly popular with video game journalists, and had been criticized for the lack of originality behind his character design as well as unfair difficulty. On the other hand, Seth's return in Street Fighter V along with the character's visual overhaul has been received more positively.

Creation and conception

The character is named after Seth Killian, Capcom's former senior manager. Killian explained in an interview dated April 2009 that it was not his idea to have the character named after himself, though he felt honored as a Street Fighter fan for being part of the series' history. In an interview with Eurogamer to promote the release of  Street Fighter IV, series producer Yoshinori Ono explained that Seth is a new character who has connections to other major characters in the game's narrative, in particular recurring series antagonist M. Bison and his Shadaloo organization who were presumed to have met their demise at the end of Street Fighter II. Ono drew attention to his vacant facial expression, strange skin coloration, and the Tanden Engine device embedded in his stomach as visual markers indicating his "unique-looking" visual design and that he is clearly not an ordinary human being.

At the conclusion of the 2019 edition of Capcom Cup, Ono and professional wrestler Kenny Omega appeared on stage to announce the unveiling of Seth as the 40th and newest addition to the Street Fighter V: Champion Edition roster, the full version of which will be released on February 14, 2020. For the character's redesign, the development team began with an “antique/old-fashioned” concept, as the goal was to make the “First” Seth. The team was also exploring the idea of an apprentice character for Gen at the time, and eventually decided to combine that idea with Seth's look in Street Fighter IV. The design direction then began to shift toward the character's finalized appearance in Street Fighter V, with a hair knot replacing the character's bald head, and inspiration for the character's silhouette drew from fierce Buddhist statues like Kongo Rikishi and Nio statues. Seth's physiology is based on the idea of a human-like being found by some organization who would “continue evolving” by absorbing the DNA of other individuals. The developers also explored the idea of Seth’s arms and legs transforming in the manner seen in Steampunk-themed movies and books, and fans would be added to the character's back to suggest a cooling down mechanism is in place to prevent overheating issues during battle. Small Tanden Engines are also implemented to work as spherical joints; when the character's epidermis expands, the power flow from the Tanden Engine becomes visible.

Gameplay
Within the Street Fighter universe, Seth is created using fighting data from the world's best fighters, which enables him to copy techniques used by other characters, such as Guile's Sonic Boom and Zangief's Spinning Piledriver. Ryota Niitsuma, assistant producer of the arcade version of Street Fighter IV, acknowledged that Seth was overpowered and was stronger than Capcom had anticipated following the launch of Street Fighter IV, and later updates for the game would tweak him to be more balanced.

For Street Fighter V, Seth is given a completely new moveset, but maintains his ability to mimic his opponents; Capcom USA employee Dan Louie explained that this is intended to make Seth "feel familiar and fresh at the same time" to players. His playstyle in each match differs not only based on the V-Skill or V-Trigger the player chooses, but will also be different based on their opponent in the case of Seth’s V-Skill I. Seth is capable of stealing moves from all 40 characters in the roster of Street Fighter V as of season 4, meaning he can even steal a special move from another Seth. Seth also uses the Tanden Engine for a special move, his super combo, and both of his ultra combos.

Appearances
In Street Fighter IV, Seth is presented as the CEO of the weapons corporation S.I.N., and has altered himself using highly advanced technology, which has changed him on a seemingly structural level and made him much more than human. Having collected data on some of the world's best fighters, Seth borrows moves from a number of different characters to create a fighting style of his own. Seth is intent on completing BLECE (Boiling Liquid Expanding Cell Explosion), which spurs the creation of a new fighting tournament. Seth is a non-playable final boss in the arcade version of Street Fighter IV, but is selectable in the home console version. In the character's ending, Seth is revealed to be "Number 15", one of many androids created by Bison which are intended to be a replacement body for him. Number 15 rebels against his programming, tries to overthrow Bison and pursue his own agenda. Another major character introduced in the game, Abel, is also revealed to be a prototype of Seth's model.

Seth appears in Street Fighter V as a post-launch DLC character for the game's season 4, and is included with the Champion Edition update. It is revealed that Seth has survived the events of IV after transferring his consciousness from his damaged original body into "Doll Unit 0", a feminine body type used in Bison's Doll Program. An updated version of Seth's original design from Street Fighter IV is available as an alternate costume for the character.

Outside of the Street Fighter series, Seth appears as a rival unit in Project X Zone, interacting with Alisa Bosconovitch, Juri, Ryu and Jin Kazama.

Reception
Seth has received an overall mixed reception. The character's visual design in Street Fighter IV is said to bear a strong resemblance to Dr. Manhattan from Watchmen. In his review of Street Fighter IV for VideoGamer.com, Wesley Yin-Poole criticized Seth, describing him as "not only cheap to fight against but a lazy effort on Capcom's part". They added that the combination of Seth's "silly name" and moves taken from existing characters made him a "disappointment". Simon Parker from Eurogamer expressed similar sentiments, and disapproved of the character's "near-unblockable (but weak) Ultra move" in particular. IGN AU, while calling him one of several "great" additions to the game's roster, considered the character "gimmicky". Official Xbox Magazine described him as the game's only major disappointment, finding his role as the game's final boss to be an anticlimax. Vulture staff ranked Seth 55th on their list of hardest video game bosses and assessed that "he doesn’t look cool or threatening, and his only function seems to be a frustration between you and the end of the game". Gavin Jasper from Den of Geek gave Seth a low placement on his ranking of Street Fighter characters in a February 2019 post and called him the "lamest" of the series' major villains, though praise is given to his fighting style as his "main saving grace" and described it as a mix between Necro and Taskmaster. Seth is ranked 67th in a worldwide Street Fighter character poll held between 2017 and 2018. Conversely, Lucas White from Destructoid considered Seth to be "an awesome boss with impossible powers", and argued that the character was "an excellent measuring stick" for the influx of new players attracted to Street Fighter IV and that his moveset served the game's purpose of "onboarding" well.

In response to Seth's reveal for Street Fighter V, Bruno Galvão from the Portuguese edition of Eurogamer and Ozzie Mejia from Shacknews expressed bemusement at Seth's redesign, as the character occupies a feminine body who still speaks with a masculine voice. White welcomed Seth's return to the series, and appreciated that Seth's moveset has retained the doppleganger gameplay archetype in some form. Eric Van Allen from US Gamer compared Seth's tactic of copying other character's moves to Kirby from the Kirby series. Ryan Collins from Red Bull commented that while the current iteration of Seth has little in common with the previous model visually, some players have indicated that they will play the character based on nostalgia. He cited professional gamer Wong "Denesis" Yin as an example, who expressed affection for the character and credited another professional gamer who played as Seth at the Evo 2011 tournament for inspiring him to play the Street Fighter series at a competitive level. Jasper welcomed the return of the character's voice actor from Street Fighter IV, Michael McConnohie, in response to Seth's reveal.

References

Notes

External links
 Character Guide 056: Seth on the official Capcom website 
 Seth on the official Street Fighter V website
 SFV: Character Introduction Series - Seth on the official Street Fighter YouTube channel
 Street Fighter V: Champion Edition – Seth Gameplay Trailer on the official Street Fighter YouTube channel
 Street Fighter IV Xbox 360 Trailer - Seth Trailer on the official IGN YouTube channel

Anthropomorphic video game characters
Artificial intelligence characters in video games
Capcom antagonists
Cyborg characters in video games
Fictional androids
Fictional androgynes
Fictional characters with energy-manipulation abilities
Fictional crime bosses
Fictional terrorists
Robot characters in video games
Robot supervillains
Street Fighter characters
Video game bosses
Video game characters introduced in 2008
Video game characters who can teleport
Male characters in video games